Ramatlabama (or Ramatlhabama) is a village and railway station  north of Mafikeng, in the North West province of South Africa. It is located on the border with Botswana, and serves as a border post for road and rail traffic. At the time of the 2011 census, Ramatlabama along with the adjoining settlement of Miga had a total population of 2,046.

Transport
Ramatlabama is the southern end of Botswana's A1 highway and the northern end of South Africa's N18. It is also the location where the Cape Town–Bulawayo railway line enters Botswana; north of Ramatlabama the railway is the main line of Botswana Railways, while to the south it is part of the network of Transnet Freight Rail.

References

Populated places in the Mafikeng Local Municipality
Botswana–South Africa border crossings